The Wyoming State Auditor is a statewide elected office in Wyoming and serves as the chief comptroller and payroll officer. The Auditor protects public money by ensuring that it is properly accounted for in the most efficient and cost effective means at all times. Promoting transparency and financial accountability are the top priorities. Its predecessor was the Wyoming Territory Auditor.  Wyoming has had a state auditor since achieving statehood in 1890. The auditor is Kristi Racines.

List of auditors of the Wyoming territory

List of state auditors of Wyoming

External links

 Official site

 
Wyoming